All Mobile Video
GUM Studios Brooklyn’s Largest CYC. 2 premium locations: 2-15 Borden Avenue, Long Island City, NY 11101 and 4508 2nd Avenue, Brooklyn, NY 11232- A Level 2 Qualified Production Facility.
 AVM Unitel, 53rd Street, 433 West 53rd: (sale and demolition announced Jan 2016) housed The Montel Williams Show 
AVM Unitel, 57th Street, 515 West 57th Street: houses CenterStage
 Chelsea Studios, 221 West 26th Street: a historic soundstage dating back to 1914; currently houses Rachael Ray and The Wendy Williams Show
Asset TV, 570 Lexington Avenue, full service live broadcasting studio 
AXA Equitable Center, 787 Seventh Avenue, includes AXA Equitable Production Group Auditorium, Atrium, and Media Studio
Disney
ABC Studios New York, Seven Lincoln Square includes: ABC News World Headquarters, Live with Kelly and Ryan, The View, ABC World News Tonight with David Muir, WABC-TV Streetside Studio (since 2011)
Times Square Studios, home of ABC's Good Morning America
Broadway Stages, home of Blue Bloods and The Good Wife
Brooklyn Fire Proof Stages, a full-service TV and Film Qualified Production Facility.
Brooklyn Studios, 8-16 43rd Ave Long Island City, NY 11101,  a full service production studio facility.
Samson Stages Brooklyn’s Premier Video Production Facility & Soundstage, A Level 2 Qualified Production Facility.
The Nutroaster: former home of Worst Cooks in America, Beat Bobby Flay, and Orange is the New Black.
The Seltzer Room Studios, production stage for I Origins, The Big Sick, and Sleepwalk With Me.
Chelsea Piers, studios for Law & Order, Law & Order: Criminal Intent and CBS Sports Network, former studio of Spin City
 Cairo Entertainment Co., a full service television & film production company. 
 dvDepot Studio and Equipment Rental House 
Contra Studios, 122 West 26th Street, production stage for Californication / House of Lies
Eastern Effects in Brooklyn: studio for The Americans
Emerging Pictures
Fox Corporation
Fox News television studios at 1211 Avenue of the Americas
B - After the Bell, Fox Business Tonight, Making Money and Varney & Co.
D - Gutfeld!
E - Bulls & Bears, Countdown to the Closing Bell, First Things First, Fox Report and Journal Editorial Report
G - Cavuto Live, Mornings with Maria and Your World with Neil Cavuto
J - America's Newsroom, America Reports, Fox & Friends First, Justice with Judge Jeanine, Sunday Morning Futures with Maria Bartiromo and Hannity
M - The Five, Fox & Friends, Outnumbered, Watters' World and The Story with Martha MacCallum
N - The Evening Edit
W - Fox Weather
Fox Television Center at East 67th Street
WNYW
Great Point Studios, Television and Film Studio, NYC 
GUM Studios, Film Studios, NYC
Hayden 5 Production Studio, 22 W 27th Street
Industrial Stages
JC Studios: formerly NBC's Brooklyn Color Studio, in Midwood, Brooklyn; former studio for The Cosby Show, Hullabaloo, Another World and As the World Turns
Kaufman Astoria Studios: home of Sesame Street
Live X, Live Streaming: studio shoots and field production
Manhattan Center: former home of ESPN2's Cold Pizza, original home of WWE's Monday Night RAW
MCM Creative: Production and post-production company with stages located in Chelsea
Metropolis Group: former studio for Food Network's Emeril Live
MIMO Studios
NBCUniversal
NBC Studios in Rockefeller Center, includes:
Studio 1A, studio for The Today Show, NBC Nightly News
Studio 3A, studio for MSNBC
Studio 3C, studio for MSNBC
Studio 3K, studio for WNBC local news
Studio 4E, studio for MSNBC
Studio 6A, currently vacant, former studio for Megyn Kelly Today, Maya & Marty, The Meredith Vieira Show, "Dr. Oz", Late Night with Conan O'Brien
Studio 6B, studio for The Tonight Show Starring Jimmy Fallon; former studio for Late Night with Jimmy Fallon and WNBC
Studio 6E, NBC News NOW
Studio 8G, studio for Late Night with Seth Meyers; former studio for The Rosie O'Donnell Show, Football Night in America and Donahue
Studio 8H, studio for Saturday Night Live
NEP Group
NEP Midtown Studio, 885 Second Avenue
NEP Penn Studios, 401 Seventh Ave (Hotel Pennsylvania) former home of The Maury Povich Show
NEP Studio 33, 503 West 33rd (sale and impending demolition announced Dec 2015) former home of Al Jazeera America and VH1 NY Studio.
NEP Studio 37, 36 West 37th Street
NEP Studio 52, 727 Eleventh Avenue; home of The Daily Show
NEP Studio 54, 513 West 54th St.; former home of The Colbert Report
NEP Studios Fifth Avenue (Studio A, B & C), 401 Fifth Avenue; former home of The People's Court
NY1 Television Studios at Chelsea Market
Paramount Global
CBS Broadcast Center:
Studio 33: 60 Minutes, former home of The CBS Evening News with Walter Cronkite
Studio 41: The Drew Barrymore Show
Studio 42: Last Week Tonight with John Oliver / Desus & Mero / The Good Dish / Real Sports with Bryant Gumbel
Studio 43: CBS Sports / CBS Sports Network (CBS co-productions of NCAA March Madness coverage with Turner Sports)
Studio 44: CBS Sports Network
Studio 45: CBS Sports (mostly Paramount Plus) / Inside Edition
Studio 46: WCBS-TV & WLNY
Studio 47: CBS Weekend News (Sunday)
Studio 57: CBS News Streaming Network and CBS Morning News, Former home of CBS This Morning
Studio 57 Newsroom: CBS News Streaming Network

Ed Sullivan Theater, aka CBS Studio 50: studio for The Late Show with Stephen Colbert; former studio for Late Show with David Letterman and The Ed Sullivan Show
Studio 1515 in One Astor Plaza, Times Square
CBS Mornings, Former home of MTV's RiverBridge Studios: Level 2 Production Facility, Staten Island
Production Central, independent green-screen studio located near Union Square
Sony
Screen Gems Studios, former studio for Rachael Ray, Guiding Light and The Edge of NightSilvercup Studios in Long Island City, Queens; studio for The Sopranos, Sex and the City, Ugly Betty, 30 Rock, Gossip Girl, and Fringe''
Steiner Studios, in the Brooklyn Navy Yard
Tisch WNET Studios at Lincoln Center
Vigilant NYC: in Flushing, Queens, location for two music videos by Swet Shop Boys
Warner Bros. Discovery
Former home of the CNN New York City Studio, in Deutsche Bank Center
WPIX Studios in the Daily News Building

References

.
.

.
New York City-related lists